Torpe may refer to:

Places
 Torpe county in Sweden, see List of hundreds of Sweden
 Torpè, Sardinia, Italy

People
 Johannes Torpe, Danish musician, see Artificial Funk

See also
 Torpes (disambiguation)
 Torp (disambiguation)